This list, 2012 in molluscan paleontology, is a list of new taxa of ammonites and other fossil cephalopods, as well as fossil gastropods and bivalves  that have been described during the year 2012.

Newly named ammonites

Note: "Sp nov" means a new species, "Gen nov" means a new genus, "et" means and, "comb nov" means a new combination (a new binomial name created by combining a known species name with a new genus name.)

Other cephalopods

Newly named gastropods

Other molluscs

References

Prehistoric molluscs
2012 in paleontology